XHPAV-FM (branded as Fiesta Mexicana) is a Mexican Spanish-language FM radio station that serves the Tampico, Tamaulipas, Mexico area. It is licensed to Pueblo Viejo, Veracruz but its transmitter and studio facilities are in Tampico.

History

XEPAV-AM 1540 was licensed to Radiorama subsidiary Mensajes Musicales, S.A., on October 4, 1994. Soon after, it moved to 1030 kHz.

In 2011, XEPAV migrated to FM on 91.7 MHz. In 2015, it was authorized to move its transmitter to a new facility in Tampico.

In 2017, XHPAV changed its name to Fiesta Mexicana, using the positioning used in other Radiorama clusters.

References

External links
 

Spanish-language radio stations
Radio stations in Tampico